Salzburg Cathedral is the seventeenth-century Baroque cathedral of the Roman Catholic Archdiocese of Salzburg in the city of Salzburg, Austria, dedicated to Saint Rupert and Saint Vergilius. Saint Rupert founded the church in 774 on the remnants of a Roman town, and the cathedral was rebuilt in 1181 after a fire. In the seventeenth century, the cathedral was completely rebuilt in the Baroque style under Prince-Bishop Wolf Dietrich von Raitenau to its present appearance. Salzburg Cathedral still contains the baptismal font in which composer Wolfgang Amadeus Mozart was baptized.

History
Saint Vergilius of Salzburg constructed the first cathedral possibly using the foundations of St. Rupert. The first Dom was recorded in 774. The so-called Virgil Dom was built from 767 to 774 and was 66 metres long and 33 metres wide.

Archbishop Arno (785–821) arranged the first renovations of the Dom, less than 70 years after its completion. In 842, the building burned after a lightning strike. Three years later, work began to rebuild the structure.

Under Archbishop Hartwig, the sanctuary expanded to the west with addition of a choir and crypt between 1000 and 1080. Archbishop Konrad I added the west towers from 1106 to 1147.

This original church, thus experienced at least three extensive building and rebuilding campaigns during the early Middle Ages, the final result of which was a somewhat ad hoc Romanesque basilica. In 1598, the basilica was severely damaged, and after several failed attempts at restoration and reconstruction, Prince-Bishop Wolf Dietrich Raitenau (Archbishop from 1587 to 1612) finally ordered it demolished. Wolf Dietrich was a patron and supporter of modern Italian Baroque architecture, having seen it from its origins in Italy and particularly Rome. Indeed, it was Wolf Dietrich who was also responsible for the building of the nearby Alte Residenz, which is today connected to the cathedral.

Wolf Dietrich hired the Italian architect Vincenzo Scamozzi to prepare a plan for a comprehensive new Baroque building. Construction did not begin however until Wolf Dietrich's successor, Markus Sittich von Hohenems (Archbishop from 1612 to 1619), in 1614 laid the cornerstone of the new cathedral. Santino Solari designed the current cathedral by dramatically altering the original Scamozzi plan.  The new sanctuary was completed 1628, less than 15 years after construction began. At its consecration on 24 September 1628, 12 choirs positioned in the marble galleries of the cathedral sang a Te Deum (the score of which is since lost) composed by Stefano Bernardi, the Kapellmeister to the Salzburg court. He made use of the balconies in works such as the 1630 Missa primi toni octo vocum. The present Salzburg Cathedral is built partially upon the foundations of the old basilica. Indeed, the foundation stones of the preceding church building may be seen in the Domgrabungen, an excavation site under the cathedral that also features mosaics and other artifacts found when this location was the forum of the Roman city Juvavum. One other surviving relic that predates the baroque edifice is the 14th century Gothic baptismal font. The relics of Saint Rupert were transferred here when the cathedral was completed.

The finished church is 142 meters long and 33 meters high at the crossing/dome. The baroque style of St. Rupert's can be seen in the choir and the nave.

The Salzburg Cathedral was damaged in 1944 during World War II when a single bomb crashed through the central dome over the crossing. Repairs were somewhat slow to take place, but restoration was complete by 1959.

Wolfgang Amadeus Mozart was baptized here on 28 January 1756, the day after his birth.

Exterior

Salzburg Cathedral is located adjacent to Residenzplatz and Domplatz in the Altstadt (Old Town) area of the city. The Domplatz is accessed by three open arcade arches in the north, south, and west. These "cathedral arches" unite the cathedral with the Salzburg Residenz and St. Peter's Abbey to form a unique enclosed square measuring 101 meters long and 69 meters wide, with walls 81 meters high.

The Domplatz is dominated by the Maria Immaculata (Immaculate Mary) column, commissioned by Archbishop Sigismund von Schrattenbach and executed by the brothers Wolfgang and Johann Baptist Hagenauer between 1766 and 1771. Modeled after similar columns in Vienna and Munich and constructed of marble and cast iron, the Maria Immaculata depicts the Virgin Mary enthroned on a mountain of clouds made of Untersberg marble and a globe.  The central Marian figure is surrounded on four sides by allegoric figures representing angels, the devil, wisdom, and the Church.  According to a plaque on the side of the cathedral, the figure group shows reactions to the mystery of the Immaculate Conception—the angels are delighted, human wisdom vanishes, the envious devil growls, and the triumphant Church rejoices. When viewed from the center of the arcades at the back of Domplatz, the classicist column is positioned in the central axis of the cathedral and shows the central Marian figure surrounded by the angels on the cathedral façade and seems to wear the crown mounted on the building.

The body of the church is made of dark grey stone with ornamentation and façade of bright Untersberg marble. The richly decorated façade is framed by two towers and topped by a curved gable. The north tower houses an old oven used for baking communion bread. The façade is divided into three horizontal sections. The lower section has three high round arches or portals that provide access to three bronze doors. The portals are flanked by four large sculpted figures representing the diocesan and cathedral patrons. Mitred figures of Saint Rupert holding a salt barrel and Saint Virgilius holding a church were created c. 1660 by Bartholomäus van Opstal and flank figures of Saint Peter holding keys and Saint Paul holding a sword, sculpted c. 1697 by Bernhard Michael Mandl, who also created all the pedestals. The bases bear the arms of the Prince Archbishop Guidobald von Thun and Prince Archbishop Johann Ernst von Thun.

Along the balustrade above the entrance are statues of the four evangelists—Saint Matthew, Saint Mark, Saint Luke, and Saint John—who represent the salvation offered through their preaching. The pediments over the three windows behind the evangelists depict a lion and an ibex, the animals depicted in the coats of arms above.  Above the center window,  a golden crown aligns with the Marian column in the Domplatz. The top section tympanum bears the arms of the builders of the cathedral, Markus Sittikus and Paris Lodron. The figure group on the pediment represents the Transfiguration of Jesus on Mount Tabor, showing Christ as Salvator Mundi, with Moses holding the tablets on the left and the prophet Elijah to the right. The three statues were created in 1660 by Tommaso di Garona, the mason who built the Residenz Fountain.

The three bronze gates inside the portals date from 1957 and 1958 and represent the three divine virtues (Göttliche Tugenden) of faith, hope, and love. The Tor des Glaubens (gate of faith) on the left was created by Toni Schneider-Manzell (1911–1996), the central Tor der Liebe (gate of love) was created by Giacomo Manzù (1908–1991), and the Tor der Hoffnung (gate of hope) on the right was created by Ewald Mataré (1887–1965).

Bells
The oldest bells in the cathedral are the Marienglocke and the Virgilglocke, both cast in 1628.  On 24 September 1961, the cathedral added five new bells.  The Salvator bell of the cathedral is the second largest bell in Austria, after the Pummerin bell in Vienna Cathedral.  The clappers are held against the sound bow whilst the bells are raised, then released sequentially to give a clean start to the ringing.  At the end they are successively caught again by the mechanism to silence the bells.

Gallery

See also
Rupertikirtag

References

Citations

Bibliography

Annotations

External links

 Salzburg Cathedral official website
 Salzburg Cathedral Museum
 Salzburg Cathedral at Tourismus Salzburg
 Salzburg Cathedral at Sacred Destinations

8th-century churches
Towers completed in the 12th century
17th-century Roman Catholic church buildings in Austria
Roman Catholic churches completed in 1628
1628 establishments in Austria
Roman Catholic cathedrals in Austria
Cathedral
Baroque church buildings in Austria
Church buildings with domes
Tourist attractions in Salzburg
Museums in Salzburg (state)
Art museums and galleries in Austria
Religious buildings and structures completed in 774
Establishments in the Prince-Archbishopric of Salzburg